Spotkanie (lit. "meeting") is a settlement in the administrative district of Gmina Szczecinek, within Szczecinek County, West Pomeranian Voivodeship, in north-western Poland.

References

External links 
German-Polish choir, named after Spotkanie
Wiktionary: spotkanie

Spotkanie